Fullarton is an inner southern suburb of Adelaide, South Australia in the City of Unley.

It adjoins Parkside, Unley, Malvern, Highgate and Myrtle Bank and is bisected by Fullarton Road.  Fullarton is bounded by Cremorne Street, Randolph Avenue and Fullarton Road in the north, Glen Osmond Road in the east, Fisher Street, Fullarton Road and Cheltenham Street in the south and Balmoral Street, Fisher Street and Windsor Street in the west.

History 
It was first developed by James Frew, who laid out the area in 1849, and named it after his wife, formerly Jane Fullarton.  The family resided at an estate Malwood on what is now known as 11 and 13 Frew Street. Other significant historic properties include Woodfield at 78 Fisher Street and Penrose at 115 Wattle Street.

Fullarton has a mix of housing styles with leafy, tree-lined streets dotted with character homes – from Victorian Villas through Edwardian, Art Deco and Californian bungalows – alongside many modern rebuilds and subdivisions.  Detached houses make up about 45 per cent of the housing stock with 45 per cent being semi-detached and units.  Fullarton also houses a number of aged care facilities including the former Julia Farr Centre.  This 2.8 hectare site is marked for redevelopment as Highgate Park.

Parks 
Fullarton Park hosts monthly Fullarton Markets for plants, produce, food and bric-a-brac and houses the Fullarton Community Centre.  Katherine St Reserve playground offers varied play areas, including a sandpit.  Fern Avenue Reserve has playground facilities while next door is the Fern Avenue Community Garden.

Schools 
Fullarton sits within the Unley Primary School and Glen Osmond Primary School and Glenunga International High School zones.

Notable people
Bronte Cockburn (born 1941), Australian basketball representative
Constance Margaret Eardley (1910–1978), botanist and curator
Joseph Fisher (1834-1907), Politician and newspaper proprietor
James Frew (1804–1878), early Adelaide pioneer and founder of Fullarton and Frewville
Andy Thomas (born 1951), first Australian astronaut in space
Hugh Wallis (1910–1994), Wallis Cinemas founder
Mary Jane Warnes (1877–1959), women's activist

References

Suburbs of Adelaide
Populated places established in 1849
1849 establishments in Australia